From Now On, Showtime! is a 2022 South Korean television series starring Park Hae-jin, Jin Ki-joo, and Jung Joon-ho. The series, directed by Lee Hyeong-min and Jeong Sang-hee for Samhwa Networks, is about a mysterious magician Cha Cha-woong and a hot-blooded policeman working with ghosts to solve cases based on hidden clues. It premiered on MBC on April 23, 2022, and aired every Saturday and Sunday at 20:40 (KST) till June 12, 2022. It is also pre-sold to OTT media services in over 190 countries.

Synopsis
The series is a romantic comedy between Cha Cha-woong (Park Hae-jin), a magician and employer of ghosts, and a passionate but hot blooded female police officer Go Seul-hae (Jin Ki-joo) with supernatural powers.

Cast and characters

Main
 Park Hae-jin as Cha Cha-woong, a ghost employer and famous magician.
 Seo Dong-hyun as young Cha Cha-woong 
 Jin Ki-joo as Go Seul-hae, a hot blooded cop with supernatural powers.
 Oh Ye-joo as young Go Seul-hae 
 Jung Joon-ho as General Choi Gum, he protected the Cha Cha-woong family from generation to generation

Supporting

People around Cha Woong
 Jung Suk-yong as Deputy Nam Sang-geon
Father Teresa of 'Magic Factory'.
 Ko Kyu-pil as Ma Dong-cheol
In charge of power, chief magician. A former gangster with a phoenix-patterned shirt and a gold necklace.
 Park Seo-yeon as Kang Ah-reum
In charge of mechanical and electronic equipment, beautiful employee.
 Kim Won-hae as Park Soo-moodang  / Cha Sa-geum 
Cha Woong's shaman grandfather. He has been serving the general god Choi Gum throughout his life.
 Cha Mi-kyung as Na Geum-ok
Cha Sa-geum's longtime colleague, she has the 'Immortal Grandma' as her body.
 Jang Ha-eun as Cheon Ye-ji, granddaughter of Na Geum-ok.

People around Go Seul-hae
 Kim Jong-tae as Ko Young-sik
 Kim Jong-hoon as Seo Hee-soo, Go Seul-hae's longtime unrequited love and the police detective team leader.

Police 
 Jeong Jae-sung as Seo Chang-ho, Hee-soo's father 
 Choi Moo-in as Min Hong-sik, gag maniac police station chief.
 Ahn Jung-kwon as Kim Il-kyung, a sincere and reliable sergeant as Seulhae's senior.
 Kim Hee-jae as Lee Yong-ryeol.
He is an adjunct gunner and a patrol partner for Seulhae
 Yang Joo-ho as Byeon Tae-sik, a detective at a powerful police station. 
 Choi Young-woo as An Shi-hoon, youngest detective
 Kim Jong-hoon as Hee-su

Others
 Ahn Chang-hwan as Tae-chun, it is that will instill intense tension. 
 Seo Dong-hyun 
 Ha Sung-kwang
 Lee Eun-gyeol
 Choi So-yul as Si-eun

Special appearances
 Shin Hyun-joon as Grim reaper 
 Park Seul-gi as MC entertainment information program
 Choi Sung-won as Minho
 Han Chowon as Aris 
 Hong Soo-hyun as Virgin ghost
 Im Won-hee as God of heaven

Production
Park Hae-jin confirmed main lead in the series in May 2021. Jin Ki-joo was offered main lead opposite Park Hae-jin in July 2021. Jung Joon-ho received offer to appear in the series in August 2021.

Samhwa Networks has signed a supply contract with PCCW, Vuclip in Singapore to sell worldwide broadcasting rights licenses on September 27, 2021, for ten years.

Script reading for the series was held on October 6, 2021, at MBC in Sangam, Mapo-gu, Seoul, and filming began on October 14.

There will also be works of art by actor Park Ki-woong that have not yet aired in the drama.

On February 18, 2022, the script reading was released.

Original soundtracks

Part 1

Part 2

Part 3

Part 4

Part 5

Part 6

Part 7

Viewership

Awards and nominations

Notes

References

External links
  
 
 From Now On, Showtime! at Daum 
  From Now On, Showtime! at Naver 
 
 

MBC TV television dramas
Korean-language television shows
2022 South Korean television series debuts 
2022 South Korean television series endings
South Korean comedy television series
South Korean comedy-drama television series
South Korean fantasy television series
Television series by Samhwa Networks
Korean-language Viu (streaming media) exclusive international distribution programming